White Eyes is the third album released by rapper Magic. It was released on March 18, 2003 through The New No Limit Records and Universal Records. The album failed to match the success of his previous albums and only made it to #147 on the Billboard 200 and #37 on the Top R&B/Hip-Hop Albums. This was Magic's final album with No Limit.

Track listing
"Intro"- 0:55
"War"- 4:32
"Hustler"- 4:32
"What U Gonna Do"- 4:15
"Creepers"- 3:22
"I'll Be There"- 2:56  (feat. Sweety)
"What Up Then"- 3:26  (feat. Monique O'Neil & S. Bear)
"Shake a Little Something"- 4:20 (feat. Partners-N-Crime & 5th Ward Weebie)
"Fire"- 2:44
"Good Life"- 3:23  (feat. 6 Piece)
"What"- 3:02
"With You"- 3:12 (feat. Tyron)
"Friday"- 4:07
"Ball Like Us"- 3:14  (feat. Suga Bear & Ezell Swang)
"Never Slippin'"- 2:58
"Smoke On"- 3:54
"Forgive Us"- 4:23
"Outro"- 0:46

References

2003 albums
Magic (rapper) albums
No Limit Records albums
Universal Records albums